Hugo Huppert (5 June 1902 in Bielitz, Austrian Silesia – 25 March 1982 in Vienna) was an Austrian poet, translator and writer.

Decorations and awards
 1964: Heinrich Heine Prize (Ministry of Culture of the GDR)
 1967: National Prize of the GDR
 1976: Art Prize of the German Democratic Republic
 1977: Austrian Cross of Honour for Science and Art, 1st class

1902 births
1982 deaths
People from Bielsko
20th-century Austrian poets
Austrian male poets
Austrian translators
Institute of Red Professors alumni
Recipients of the National Prize of East Germany
Recipients of the Art Prize of the German Democratic Republic
Recipients of the Austrian Cross of Honour for Science and Art, 1st class
20th-century translators
20th-century Austrian male writers